Phylloxiphia formosa is a moth of the family Sphingidae. It is found from Sierra Leone, Liberia and Ivory Coast to the Central African Republic, Uganda and Tanzania, south to Zambia.

References

Phylloxiphia
Moths described in 1914
Moths of Africa